Jan Niklas Berggren (born 25 January 1966) is a Swedish curler and curling coach.

He competed for Sweden in four .

Teams

Record as a coach of national teams

Personal life
His father Tom is a curler as well. He is a 1974 World championship silver medallist and a 1974 Swedish men's curling champion.

References

External links
 

Living people
1966 births
Swedish male curlers
Swedish curling coaches